The Noorduyn Norseman, also known as the C-64 Norseman, is a Canadian single-engine bush plane designed to operate from unimproved surfaces. Distinctive stubby landing gear protrusions from the lower fuselage make it easily recognizable.

Introduced in 1935, the Norseman remained in production for almost 25 years with over 900 produced. A number of examples remain in commercial and private use to this day. Norseman aircraft are known to have been registered and/or operated in 68 countries and also have been based and flown in the Arctic and Antarctic regions.

Design and development

Designed by Robert B.C. Noorduyn, the Noorduyn Norseman was produced from 1935 to 1959, originally by Noorduyn Aircraft Ltd. and later by the Canadian Car and Foundry company.

With the experience of working on many ground-breaking designs at Fokker, Bellanca and Pitcairn-Cierva, Noorduyn decided to create his own design in 1934, the Noorduyn Norseman. Along with his colleague, Walter Clayton, Noorduyn created his original company, Noorduyn Aircraft Limited, in early 1933 at Montreal while a successor company was established in 1935, bearing the name Noorduyn Aviation.

Noorduyn's vision of an ideal bush plane began with a high-wing monoplane airframe to facilitate loading and unloading passengers and cargo at seaplane docks and airports; next, a Canadian operator utilizing existing talents, equipment and facilities should be able to make money using it; last, it should be all-around superior to those already in use there.

From the outset, Noorduyn designed his transport to have interchangeable wheel, ski or twin-float landing gear. Unlike most aircraft designs, the Norseman was first fitted with floats, then skis and, finally, fixed landing gear.

The final design looked much like Noorduyn's earlier Fokker designs, a high-wing braced monoplane with an all-welded steel tubing fuselage. Attached wood stringers carried a fabric skin. Its wing was all fabric covered wood, except for steel tubing flaps and ailerons. The divided landing gear were fitted to fuselage stubs; legs were secured with two bolts each to allow the alternate arrangement of floats or skis. The tail strut could be fitted with a wheel or tail skid.

Operational history

The first Norseman, powered by a Wright R-975-E3 Whirlwind, was flight tested on floats on November 14, 1935 and was sold and delivered to Dominion Skyways Ltd. on January 18, 1936, registered as "CF-AYO" and named “Arcturus." In summer 1941, Warner Brothers leased CF-AYO for the filming of "Captains of the Clouds" starring James Cagney. Principal aerial photography took place near North Bay, Ontario with CF-AYO carrying temporary registration "CF-HGO." CF-AYO was lost in a crash in Algonquin Park in 1952. Its wreckage currently is on display at the Canadian Bushplane Heritage Centre.

Almost immediately, the Norseman proved itself to be a rugged, reliable workhorse with steady sales. The first aircraft, CF-AYO, was designated the Norseman Mk I.  The  next aircraft, "CF-BAU," having some minor changes required after the  certification tests, and a new Pratt & Whitney R-1340 Wasp SC-1 engine up-rated from 420 to 450 hp, was designated Norseman Mk II while the next three aircraft were Norseman Mk IIIs:  "CF-AZA" going to MacKenzie Air Service, Edmonton, Alberta, "CF-AZE" to Prospector Airways, Clarkson, Ontario and "CF-AZS" to Starrat Airways, Hudson, Ontario. "CF-BAU" would be modified on June 26, 1937 to become the prototype Norseman Mk IV, powered by a Pratt & Whitney Wasp S3H-1. The Mk IV became the "definitive" model but the production run might have ended at a few hundred examples if not for the advent of the Second World War.

Second World War
Until 1940, the Noorduyn company had sold only 17 aircraft in total, primarily to commercial operators in Canada's north and to the Royal Canadian Mounted Police. With the outbreak of war in Europe, demand for a utility transport led to major military orders. The Royal Canadian Air Force and the United States Army Air Forces became the two largest operators; the RCAF ordered 38 Norseman Mk IVWs for radio and navigational training for the Commonwealth Air Training Plan.

USAAF Colonel Bernt Balchen had been involved in establishing a staging route across Greenland to facilitate the ferrying of aircraft from North America to Europe. He required a bush plane rugged enough to survive in the harsh conditions of the Arctic. After evaluating six Norsemans  diverted from a previous RCAF order, late in 1941, he recommended the purchase of the Norseman Mk IV specially modified to USAAF requirements as the YC-64A. After the US entry into the Second World War, the USAAF placed the first of several orders for a production version C-64A Norseman. Deliveries began in mid-1942, with the American military eventually placing orders for 749 Norseman Mk IVs as the C-64A (later UC-64A).

Throughout the Second World War, the USAAF Norseman aircraft were used in North America (primarily Alaska) as well as other in theaters of war, including Europe. Three UC-64As were used by the US Navy under the designation JA-1. Six C-64B floatplanes were used by the US Army Corps of Engineers, as well as by other Allied air forces, which placed orders for 43 Norseman Mk IVs. The RCAF ordered an additional 34 aircraft as Norseman Mk VI. Noorduyn was the sole manufacturer, but when the USAAF considered ordering a larger number of C-64As, license production of 600 by Aeronca Aircraft Corp. (Middletown, Ohio) was contemplated before the contract was cancelled in 1943.

Major Glenn Miller was a passenger on a UC-64A Norseman (s/n 44-70285) flown by F/O John R. S. Morgan which disappeared over the English Channel on December 15, 1944, possibly due to aircraft carburetor icing or being struck by bombs jettisoned from RAF Lancasters after an aborted raid.

The tower, part of the celebrated Stourhead estate and landscape, was not repaired until 1986 which included the use of a Wessex helicopter to lower a  stone onto the top.

Postwar

In postwar production, the Canada Car and Foundry in Fort William, Ontario acquired rights to the Norseman design, producing a version known as the Norseman Mk V, a civilian version of the wartime Mk  IV. In order to exploit the market further, the "Can Car" factory designed and built the Norseman Mk VII. This version had a bigger engine, a new all-metal wing and greater cargo capacity but was fated never to go into production. With large Korean War commitments at that time, the company put it into temporary storage where it was destroyed in a hangar fire in September 1951.

In 1953, Noorduyn headed a group of investors who bought back the jigs and equipment from Canada Car and Foundry and started a new company called Noorduyn Norseman Aircraft Ltd. Bob Noorduyn became ill and died at his home in South Burlington, Vermont, on 22 February 1959. The company continued to provide support for operating Norseman aircraft and built three new Mk Vs before selling its assets in 1982 to Norco Associates. Norco provided support services only, as Norseman aircraft manufacture was labor-intensive and very expensive.

The last Noorduyn Norseman to be built was sold and delivered to a commercial customer on January 19, 1959. A total of 903 Norseman aircraft (Mk I - Mk V) were produced and delivered to various commercial and military customers. There are currently 42 Norseman aircraft on the active Canadian aircraft registry and 9 active in the United States. The number in use worldwide is not known.

In recognition of the Norseman's role in serving the remote villages of northern Canada, the town of Red Lake, Ontario, a jumping-off point for remote communities in Northwestern Ontario, promotes itself as The Norseman Capital of the World. Each summer in July, the "Norseman Floatplane Festival" brings Norseman aircraft to Red Lake as the centrepiece of a community based weekend festival ranging from stage entertainment, children's games and rides, contests, cultural and historical displays and street vendors with craft and specialty booths.

The Canadian Second World War "ace-of-aces" George Beurling died in a Norseman while landing at Urbe Airport in Rome, Italy, in May 1948. Beurling had been ferrying the aircraft to the nascent Israeli Air Force. The remains of another Israeli Air Force Norseman adorn the IAF's memorial to its fallen on Har Hatayasim (Pilots' Mountain) near Jerusalem. The plane had crashed during Operation Maccabi of the 1948 Arab-Israeli War.

Norseman aircraft have appeared in the films Grey Owl (1999) and The Snow Walker (2003).

Operators

Major civil operators

Aviación del Litoral Fluvial Argentino

Austin Airways (retired)
Bearskin Airlines (retired)
Buffalo Airways (retired)
Canadian Airways & Western Canada Airways (retired) 
Canadian Pacific Airlines (retired)
Central Northern Airways (retired)
Imperial Oil (retired)
Lamb Air
Ontario Central Airlines (retired)
Ontario Provincial Air Service - 4 (1943 to 1947) eventually sold 1951 to 1952
Pacific Western Airlines
Royal Canadian Mounted Police
Saskatchewan Air Ambulance
Saskatchewan Government Airways
Starratt Airways

Fjellfly 
Norving
Widerøes Flyveselskap

Far Eastern Air Transport Inc. (FEATI) (1946-1947)
Philippine Airlines (transferred from FEATI, from 1947-1955)

Military operators

 

 Royal Australian Air Force operated 14 aircraft from 1943 to 1946.
 No. 1 Communications Unit RAAF
 No. 3 Communications Unit RAAF
 No. 4 Communications Unit RAAF
 No. 5 Communications Unit RAAF
 No. 7 Communications Unit RAAF
 
 Brazilian Air Force operated 19 aircraft from 1944 to 1960
 
 Royal Canadian Air Force operated 79 aircraft from 1940 to 1953
 103 Search and Rescue Squadron
 Royal Canadian Navy operated 21 aircraft from 1943 to 1957

 Air Surveillance Service operated one aircraft in 1948

 Cuban Air Force received one aircraft in 1951

 Czechoslovakian Air Force operated Norseman postwar under designation K-73.
 
 Egyptian Air Force operated two aircraft from 1948 to 1960

 Honduran Air Force operated two aircraft from 1945 to 1961

 Indonesian Air Force received one aircraft in 1950

 Israeli Air Force operated 17 aircraft from 1948 to 1954

 Royal Netherlands East Indies Army Air Force operated one aircraft from 1948 to 1950

 Royal Norwegian Air Force operated 22 aircraft from 1945 to 1959

 Philippine Air Force operated two aircraft from 1946 to 1952

 Swedish Air Force operated three aircraft from 1949 to 1959

 Royal Air Force

 United States Army Air Corps
 United States Army Air Forces
 United States Air Force
 United States Navy purchased three Norsemans in 1945 (under designation JA-1) to support Antarctic expeditions like Operation Highjump.

Specifications (Norseman Mark V)

See also

References

Notes

Bibliography
 
 Grant, Robert S. Noorduyn Norseman: Red Lake, Ontario, Canada, Norseman Capital of the World. Red Lake, Ontario: Norseman Floatplane Festival, 2007. (booklet)

 Mathisrud, Nils. Norwegian Wings #1: Noorduyn Norseman Mk. IV & Mk. VI. Oslo: FlyGloster Publishing, 2007. .
 Milberry, Larry. Aviation in Canada. Toronto: McGraw-Hill Ryerson, 1979. .
 Munson, Kenneth. Bombers, Patrol and Transport Aircraft 1939-1945. London: Blandford Press, 1969. .

External links

Norduyn website (company name altered)
Archived Noorduyn Norseman website
Unofficial Noorduyn Norseman website
Archived historical website, maintained by Julie Boddy, great-granddaughter of Robert B.C. Noorduyn

1930s Canadian civil utility aircraft
Single-engined tractor aircraft
High-wing aircraft
Norseman
Aircraft first flown in 1935